Airborne Windsports, also called Airborne Australia and officially Airborne Windsports Pty Ltd, is an Australian ultralight trike  and hang glider aircraft manufacturer based in Redhead, New South Wales. The aircraft are supplied as factory completed aircraft and are not available as kits.

The company has had active representation in the United States by Airborne America of Dallas, Texas and U.S. AirBorne Sport Aviation of Asotin, Washington and has recorded strong sales there.

Aircraft

References

External links

Aircraft manufacturers of Australia
Hang gliders
Ultralight trikes